Hans Koch was a member of the German resistance against Nazism.

Hans Koch may also refer to:

 Hans Koch (SS officer) (1912–1955), SS-Unterscharführer
 Hans Koch (footballer), Swiss footballer
 Hans Jørgen Koch, Deputy State Secretary at the Danish Ministry of Climate and Energy
 Hans-Karl Koch (1897–1934), Nazi Party politician and SA-general, see Victims of the Night of the Long Knives
 Hans Koch (musician) (born 1948), plays jazz clarinets and saxophones, see Stone, Brick, Glass, Wood, Wire
 Hans Koch (clockmaker) Clockmaker to Albrechts V. Master in the Munich Guild in 1554. Between 1557 and 1599 he was clockmaker to the Duke's Court in Munich.